Hüseyin Hilmi Pasha (also spelled Hussein Hilmi Pasha) (1 April 1855 – 1922) was an Ottoman statesman and imperial administrator. He was twice the Grand Vizier of the Ottoman Empire around the time of the Second Constitutional Era. He was also one-time president of the Turkish Red Crescent.

Hüseyin Hilmi was one of the most successful Ottoman administrators in the explosive Balkans of the early 20th century, becoming the Ottoman Inspectorate-General of Macedonia from 1902 to 1908, Minister of the Interior from 1908 to 1909, and ambassador to Austria-Hungary from 1912 to 1918. He is often regarded, along with Ahmet Rıza Bey and Hasan Fehmi Pasha, as one of the leading statesmen who encouraged and propagated further progressivism.

Biography

Hüseyin Hilmi was born in September 1855 in Midilli, in the district of Sarlıca. He was the son of Kütahyalızade Tüccar Mustafa Efendi, who was from a family of merchants originating from Kütahya and have settled in the island when Hüseyin Hilmi's grandfather made the move into the island. He was of partial Greek ancestry, an ancestor had converted to Islam. He did his primary studies in Lesbos and learned fluent French at an early age. He started out as a clerk in the Ottoman state structure and gradually climbed the ladder of the hierarchy, becoming the governor of Adana in 1897 and of Yemen in 1902. That same year in 1902, he was appointed Inspectorate-General with responsibility over virtually all of the Balkan territories of the Ottoman Empire at the time, namely the vilayets of Salonica, Kosovo and Manastir.

After the 1908 revolution, he was appointed as Minister of the Interior and then served as Grand Vizier, at first between February 14, 1909, and April 13, 1909, under Abdul Hamid II and then, reassuming the post from Ahmet Tevfik Pasha a month later, between May 5, 1909, and December 28, 1909. As such, in his first vizierate, he was the last grand vizier of Abdul Hamid II. His first term was suddenly interrupted because of the 31 March Incident (which actually occurred on April 13), when for a few days, reactionary absolutists and Islamic fundamentalists took back control of the Ottoman government in Constantinople until the arrival of an army from Salonica that suppressed the attempted countercoup.

After his second term as grand vizier under Mehmed V, Hüseyin Hilmi Pasha served as the Minister of Justice in the succeeding Ahmed Muhtar Pasha cabinet. In October 1912, he was sent to Vienna as the Ottoman ambassador to Austria-Hungary, a position he held until the end of World War I. Due to health problems, he remained in Vienna until his death in 1922. He was buried in Beşiktaş, Istanbul.

See also 
 List of Ottoman Grand Viziers
 Greek Muslims

References

 Emine Onhan Evered, "An educational prescription for the Sultan: Huseyin hilmi pasa's advice for the maladies of empire," Middle Eastern Studies, 43,3 (2007), 439–459.

1855 births
1922 deaths
20th-century Grand Viziers of the Ottoman Empire
Ambassadors of the Ottoman Empire to Austria-Hungary
Government ministers of the Ottoman Empire
Civil servants from the Ottoman Empire
People from the Ottoman Empire of Greek descent
People from Lesbos
20th-century diplomats
Ottoman governors of Yemen
Members of the Senate of the Ottoman Empire